The canton of Aubenas-2 is an administrative division of the Ardèche department, southern France. It was created at the French canton reorganisation which came into effect in March 2015. Its seat is in Aubenas.

It consists of the following communes:
 
Ailhon
Aubenas (partly)
Fons
Lachapelle-sous-Aubenas
Lanas
Lentillères
Mercuer
Saint-Didier-sous-Aubenas
Saint-Étienne-de-Boulogne
Saint-Étienne-de-Fontbellon
Saint-Michel-de-Boulogne
Saint-Privat
Saint-Sernin
Vesseaux
Vinezac

References

Cantons of Ardèche